KPCQ (1490 AM) is a radio station broadcasting a Contemporary Christian format. Licensed to Chubbuck, Idaho, United States, the station serves the Pocatello area. The station is currently owned by Ted Austin, through licensee Snake River Radio, LLC.

History
The station went on the air as KKLB on September 12, 1980. On February 4, 1987, the station changed its call sign to KRCD. On July 13, 1998, the call again changed, this time to KRTK. On February 15, 2019, the station changed its call sign to the current KPCQ.

References

External links

Radio stations established in 1981
1981 establishments in Idaho
Contemporary Christian radio stations in the United States
Pocatello, Idaho metropolitan area
PCQ